XHOZ-FM may refer to:

XHOZ-FM (Querétaro), Imagen 94.7 FM
XHOZ-FM (Veracruz), Amor 91.7 FM